National symbols of Montenegro are the symbols that are used in Montenegro to represent what is unique about the nation, reflecting different aspects of its cultural life and history.

Symbols of Montenegro

 
Montenegrin culture

References